"Alleys of Peril" is a Sailor Steve Costigan short story by Robert E. Howard.  It was originally published in the January 1931 issue of Fight Stories. 

The story is now in the public domain.

References

External links

 List of stories and publication details at Howard Works

Short stories by Robert E. Howard
Pulp stories
1931 short stories
Short stories about boxing
Works originally published in Fight Stories